Sabharwal (Sanskrit: सभरवाल) is a surname originating among Hindus and Sikhs of the Punjab region in India. It is derived from the name of a name of a King of the Khatri clan, Shubh Vaar, which means lucky or auspicious day (Shubh = Lucky/Auspicious & Vaar = Day). Kamal Shankar Srivastava writes that all Khukrains including Sabharwals were originally found near the banks of Indus and Jhelum river especially in the towns of Pind Dadan Khan, Peshawar and Nowshera.

According to historian Harjinder Singh, many Sabharwals were agriculturists but later they went through an occupational change and hence turned to other professions. Bhai Nihala and Bhai Naval were considered the leaders of the Sabharwal clan who dedicated their lives to Guru Tegh Bahadur who are also mentioned in Bhai Gurdas' Vaar 11. Lalo Sabharwal was a prominent Sikh during the time of Guru Angad. Lalo was one of the 22 major missionaries appointed by Guru Angad who spread the message of Sikhism all around India. Many Sabharwal Khatris joined the Sikhism faith.

Notable people 
Notable people bearing the Sabharwal name, who may or may not be connected to the clan, include:

Administrators 
 Dharam Pal Sabharwal, Member of the Parliament of India representing Punjab in the Rajya Sabha
 Sharat Sabharwal, Indian civil servant who, Indian High Commissioner to Pakistan
 Smita Sabharwal, IAS Officer, the first female IAS Officer to be appointed to the Chief Minister's Office
 Sunil Sabharwal, alternate Executive Director of the International Monetary Fund

Athletes 

 Rohit Sabharwal, Indian cricketer

Creatives 

 Manoj Sabharwal, Indian scriptwriter
 Rohan Sabharwal, Indian filmmaker
 Tara Sabharwal, India-born USA-based painter and printmaker

Film actors 

 Anchal Sabharwal, Indian actress and model
 Lata Sabharwal, Indian actress

Jurist 

 Yogesh Kumar Sabharwal, 36th Chief Justice of India

Scientists and doctors 

 Ashutosh Sabharwal, professor of electrical engineering
 Madan Mohan Sabharwal, Indian social worker
 Malvika Sabharwal, Indian gynecologist and obstetrician

References 

Indian surnames
Surnames of Indian origin
Punjabi-language surnames
Hindu surnames
Khatri clans
Khatri surnames